Raktdhar is a 2017 Indian Hindi-language action drama film written and directed by Ajit Varma. The film stars Jimmy Sharma, Shakti Kapoor, Mukesh Rishi, and Deepshika Nagpal. The film producer is Chitra Films Productions.  Raktdhar was released in India in October 2017.

Cast
 Jimmy Sharma
 Shakti Kapoor 
 Shahbaz Khan
 Mukesh Rishi
 Deepshika Nagpal

References

External links
 

2017 films
2010s Hindi-language films
Indian action drama films
Cross-dressing in Indian films
2017 action drama films